Rancho Las Palmas also known as the Hiram Corey house, is a historic Queen Anne style house located at 100 River Road, Salinas, California. It was built by Hiram Corey in 1891, one of Monterey County's most successful stock farmers of the late 19th century. The house was listed on the National Register of Historic Places on January 4, 1978, as Rancho Las Palmas. Today, the historic mansion is located in a gated residential community named Las Palmas Ranch and was renamed Chateau Coralini, which is open to the public as a boutique inn.

History

The Rancho Las Palmas estate was part of the original  Rancho Buena Vista, Spanish land concession in the Salinas Valley, in present day Monterey County, California that was given in 1795 to José Maria Soberanes (1753-1803) and Joaquin Castro.

In 1872, Hiram Corey leased  of Rancho Buena Vista, keeping 450 to 500 cows on the ranch. He purchased the property in 1882. The ranch became known as one of the best dairy farms in California. In 1889, he sold the land to the Buena Vista Land Company and took his family to Europe. While traveling in Europe in 1889, Corey's wife fell in love with Chateau Versailles and wanted her home in Salinas to be her own chateau. In 1891, on his return to the United States, he purchased  of Rancho Buena Vista, renaming the property Rancho Las Palmas. He went into horse breading, specializing in draft horses and roadsters. 

Hiram Corey and his wife designed and built the Rancho Las Palmas 20-room mansion for his family in 1891, with the assistance of Salinas architect, and Corey's nephew, Carlton Bassett, for $4,000. He originally operated the land as a stock ranch. It was known as one of the best beef and dairy ranches in the state of California. His wife furnished the home with fine antiques and artwork. 

The Hiram Corey mansion is a three-story, wood-frame, single-family residence built in a Queen Anne style. It is the best example of Queen Anne style of architecture in a rural setting in Monterey County. It has redwood siding, banded with fish-scale shingles halfway into the second story, with a hipped roof and tower with a brass eagle finial detail. Full bay windows can be seen on the first and second stories. The main entrance to the house has stairs leading up to double wood doors with a Queen Anne style wood railing and canopy. Some of the original palm trees line the entrance. A small one story carriage house remains at the rear of the house.

Hiram Corey

Hiram Corey (1831-1913) was born on March 7, 1831, in Stanbridge, Quebec, Canada. His father was Captain Reuben Caleb Corey (1801-1859) of Hancock, Massachusetts, who came to Canada when he was two years old. He joined the military service with a commission from Queen Victoria. Corey's mother was Melinda Reynolds (1803-1881) of New York. Hiram Corey arrived from Canada to California on February 26, 1852, with his brother Noah Corey (1827-1909) and went into the lumber business in Marin County. He later took up dairy farming in the same county until 1861. In 1856, on a trip to Vermont, he married Rosanna Cox Frost (1834-1900), a native of Shoreham, Vermont, on October 8, 1856, in Essex, Vermont. They had no children.

Hiram's sister, Sarah Ann (Corey) Littlefield, died on June 1, 1871, leaving 4 small children under 6, to live with Corey and Rosanna.

He purchased it in 1882. In 1889, he sold the land to Buena Vista Land Company and took his family to Europe. In 1891, he purchased  of the ranch, renaming the property the Rancho Las Palmas. Corey and his wife designed and built the Rancho Las Palmas for his family in 1891.

His wife, Rosanna died on March 9, 1900, in Salinas. Corey then married Frances Elfreda Eade (1870-1953) of Jo Daviess County, Illinois, on May 24, 1901, in Salinas, and they had one child together, Augusta Eleanor Corey (1902–1988). She had another child, Emily Pearl Johnson (1895–1970), by a former marriage to Thomas J. Johnson (1863–1897).

Corey was a director of the Monterey County Bank in Salinas, director of Monterey District Agricultural Association, and trustee and a member of the United Presbyterian Church of Salinas.

Corey died in the Lane Hospital in San Francisco on January 18, 1913, at the age of 82. Funeral services were held at the United Presbyterian Church in Salinas and he was buried at the Independent Order of Oddfellows Cemetery in Salinas.

Legacy

After Corey died in 1913, his second wife, Frances, inherited the deed of conveyance on the real and personal property that was worth approximately $200,000. She sold Rancho Las Palmas to Joe Violini in 1918, who in 1943 passed it to his four children. Frances moved to Palo Alto with her children.

In 1979, the Violini family sold the property to the Las Palmas Ranch Venture which began the process to subdivide the land for future development. In 1988, the title again changed hands and it was acquired by the Las Palmas Property Development Company, which completed the subdivision. During this time the Corey House was used as a sales office for the Las Palmas Development Company. 

In May 2003, the historic Corey House mansion was bought by Samuel and Linda Persall and converted to a bed and breakfast inn. They renamed it to Chateau Coralini Retreat and Spa. The Persalls had the house and property restored by John Larsen & Sons in 2007. The restoration involved removing all the interior floors, walls, and ceilings and adding new walls, insulation, heating and air, plumbing (installing 12 bathrooms), alarm and sprinkler systems. The wood casings, originals doors, hinge and iron hardware, plaster medallions and corbels, staircase banister, fireplace tilework, and original stained glass were restored. The name Chateau Coralini was created by the Persalls to honor the Coreys and Violinis who once lived in the mansion. A children's dollhouse, built by the Las Palmas Development Company, was purchased by the Persalls and brought to the estate.

Gallery

See also
 National Register of Historic Places listings in Monterey County, California

References

External links

 Office of Historic Preservation - Rancho Las Palmas
 National Historic Places in Salinas

  

Houses on the National Register of Historic Places in California
Houses on the National Register of Historic Places in Monterey County, California
Queen Anne architecture in California
Houses completed in 1891
Houses in Monterey County, California
Buildings and structures in Monterey, California
National Register of Historic Places in Monterey County, California